The Chinese Chess Association (CCA) (中国国际象棋协会) is the governing body of chess in China, one of the federations of FIDE, and a member of the Asian Chess Federation (ACF). It is the principal authority over all chess events in China, including the China Chess League (CCL). Founded in 1986, the CCA is headquartered in Beijing.

History
Due to its unpopularity in the country the game of chess was first affiliated to the Chinese Xiangqi Association when it was established in November 1962. With the achievements made by Chinese chess players in major world tournaments and the increasing popularity of the game in China, the Chinese Chess Association was formed in 1986, with Hong Lin as the president. Former women's world champion Xie Jun was appointed president in 2019.

Role
CCA is a member of the National Olympic Committee and officially joined FIDE in 1975. Its aims are to promote and popularize the game of chess and general organization of the chess sport in China, represent the country on the international stage, coordinate the activities of clubs and regional associations as well as organization of individual and team tournaments and championships (in different age categories). It promotes the participation of the game in schools.

The CCA selects and finances the Chinese national team for the biannual Chess Olympiad, World Team Chess Championships (every 4 years), Asian Team Chess Championships, Asian Chess Games, Asian Indoor Games, national chess summits, and it also funds players' training and for them to participate in individual tournaments.

National team

Following is a name list of the national chess team setup:
 Team manager: Lin Feng
 Deputy team manager: Li Wenliang
 Head coach: Ye Jiangchuan
 Deputy head coach: Zhang Weida
 Coaches: Xu Jun, Yin Hao, Yu Shaoteng
 Players:

Men's team
 Ding Liren
 Yu Yangyi
 Wei Yi
 Bu Xiangzhi
 Ni Hua
 Wang Yue
 Wang Hao
 Li Chao
 Lu Shanglei
 Bai Jinshi
 Zhou Jianchao
 Wen Yang
 Xu Xiangyu

Women's team
 Hou Yifan
 Ju Wenjun
 Tan Zhongyi
 Lei Tingjie
 Zhao Xue
 Shen Yang
 Huang Qian
 Guo Qi
 Ding Yixin
 Zhai Mo

Commissions
 Judges Commission
 Press & Publicity Commission
 Technical Training Commission
 Junior Working Commission
 Promotion & Development Commission
 Qualification Appraisal Commission
 Women Working Commission
 External Affairs Commission

Funding
Officials of the Chinese Chess Association are appointed by the National Sports Committee which also provides funding.

The Chinese Chess Association, in 1993, received an endowment fund from Singapore businessman Mr. Lee Seng Tee who donated about US$1.5 million. Ten percent of this donation was for the establishment of the Chess library in China QiYuan. The remaining 90% were deposited in a fixed account from which the Chinese Chess Association drew interest mainly for its administrative operations and to send players for overseas competitions. In 1997, the Chinese Chess Association founded a computer firm to fund its other activities on an annual basis.

See also
 Geography of chess
 Chess in China
 Chinese Chess Championship, national championship
 Zhongguo Qiyuan, an official national super-agency responsible for board games and card games

References

National members of the Asian Chess Federation
Chess in China
Chess
1986 establishments in China
Sports organizations established in 1986
Chess organizations
1986 in chess